Blahodatne, known as Petrivske until 2016, is a village in Kherson Raion, Kherson Oblast, southern Ukraine, about  north-west from the centre of Kherson city.

History 
The village came under attack by Russian forces in May 2022, during the Russian invasion of Ukraine. The Russian troops were driven back by Ukrainian forces on 8 June 2022.

On 5 September the Russian Armed Forces recaptured the village.. On 10 November, Ukrainian troops regained full control over the village.

Demographics
The settlement had 1008 inhabitants in 2001. The native language distribution according to the 2001 Ukrainian Census was:
Ukrainian: 91.89%
Russian: 7.43%
Moldovan (Romanian): 0.20%
Belarusian: 0.10%
 Other languages: 0.38%

References

External links

Villages in Kherson Raion
Chornobaivka rural hromada